The Bahuchara Mata is a Hindu goddess of chastity and fertility in her Maiden aspect, of the incarnation of the Hinglaj. Like other divinities in Gujarat and Rajasthan, Bahuchara is of Charan origin. Devi Bahuchara was the daughter of Bapaldanji Detha. She is also considered the patroness of the hijra community. Her primary temple is located in Becharaji town in Mehsana district of Gujarat, India.

Bahuchara was worshipped by a dacoit of the Koli caste, Bapaiya, and her shrine was established by him under a Varakhada tree after her death in Shankhalpur.

Depiction and symbols 
Bahuchara was born in the Charan (Gadhvi) society. Devi Bahuchara was the daughter of Bapaldaan Detha.
Bahuchara Mata is shown as a woman who carries a sword on her bottom left, a text of scriptures on her top left, the abhay hasta mudra ("showering of blessings") on her bottom right, and a trident on her top right. She is seated on a rooster, which symbolises innocence.

One of the theories says that she is one of the goddesses in Sri Chakra. The real symbol of her vehicle is kurkut which means the serpent which has two mouths. Bahucharaji is seated on the low end and the other end goes to Sahasrara, which means that Bahucharaji is the goddess starting the awakening of kundalini which eventually leads the liberation or moksha.

Legends 
According to ancient tradition, It is said that Bahuchara was born in a Dethe family in Marwar. Her father Bopal was a court poet in Kathiawad and her mother Deval was an incarnation of a goddess. Once when she and her sister were travelling to meet their father, they halted at Shankhalpur. There they were attacked and killed by a Koli tormentor named Bapaiya. Before dying Bahuchara cursed him that he would turn into an eunuch. But when he begged apology, she asked him to start a temple to worship her as a goddess. She also promised that any eunuch who would stay there in female attire and worship her as goddess would attain salvation and secure a place in her abode. Bapaiya on becoming an eunuch erected the shrine of the goddess under a varakhda tree and passed his life in her worship. Many feel that in reality Vauchara may have been an old Koli goddess.

Temple

Bahucharaji Temple is located in Bahucharaji town in Mehsana district of Gujarat, India. It is 82 km from Ahmedabad and 35 km west of Mahesana.  The original shrine was built by a king called Sankhal Raj in 1152 CE and the first surviving mention of the shrine was found in an inscription dating 1280 CE. According to the inscription no changes were made in the temple architecture until the eighteenth century.

There are three shrines of the Goddess within the temple complex. The oldest part of the shrine complex termed 'Adyasthan' (the original site) is a small temple enclosing a sprawling, small-leafed varakhadi tree, believed to be the site where the goddess first appeared. Adjoining this is another small temple, the madhya sthan (second or intermediate place), which houses an incised plaque representing the goddess and has a locked silver door at its entrance. This part of the temple is believed to have been built by a Maratha named Fadnavis (or an official with that title) in the eighteenth century. In 1779 CE, Manajirao Gaekwad, the younger brother of the Maratha ruler of Baroda, built a third structure close to the original shrine after the goddess cured him of a tumor. The third is the main temple today and contains the Bala Yantra of quartz crystal representing the Goddess. Saint Kapildev and Kalari king Tejpal have also contributed to the construction and renovation of the temple. The temple complex is beautifully decorated with stone carvings and wall paintings. Though less well known outside of Gujarat and Rajasthan, the temple is considered a minor Shakti Peetha and every year about 1.5 million pilgrims visit this temple.

Notes

References
 Aggleton, Peter. Culture, Society and Sexuality: A Reader, Taylor & Francis 2007, p. 240 
 Abbott, Elizabeth. A History of Celibacy, James Clarke & Co. 2001, pp. 329–330 
 Ellingson, Stephen. Religion and Sexuality in Cross-Cultural Perspective, Routledge 2002 
 Young, Serenity. Courtesans and Tantric Consorts, Routledge 2004, p. 111

External links
 Official site of the Shri Bahucharaji Temple
 Bahucharaji Mata Temple in Becharaji near Mehsana
 Bahuchara Mata: Liberator, Protector and Mother of the Hijras in Gujarat

Hijra (South Asia)
Hindu temples in Gujarat
Hindu goddesses
Hindu folk deities
Fertility goddesses
Virgin goddesses
Transgender topics and religion
Transgender in Asia
Charan
Mehsana district
Cāraṇa Sagatī